Garden Township is one of seventeen townships in Boone County, Iowa, USA.  As of the 2000 census, its population was 1,022.

History
Garden Township was organized in 1871.

Geography
According to the USGS, it contains two cemeteries: Garden Prairie and Hillsdale.

References

External links
 US-Counties.com
 City-Data.com

Townships in Boone County, Iowa
Townships in Iowa
1871 establishments in Iowa